Can't Hurry Love is an American sitcom television series created by Gina Wendkos, starring Nancy McKeon that aired on CBS from September 18, 1995, to February 26, 1996.

Premise
The series is about Annie, a single, thirty-something woman living in New York and her three friends: Didi, Roger and Elliot. The general premise of the series centers around love seeking by Annie. Most of the action takes place in either Annie's small apartment or the employment agency she manages. Roger and Elliot work with her at the agency and Didi, the beautiful free spirit of the group, often drops by the agency  or Annie's apartment.

Cast
 Nancy McKeon as Annie O'Donnell
 Mariska Hargitay as Didi Edelstein
 Louis Mandylor as Roger Carlucci
 Kevin Crowley as Elliot Tenney

Cancellation
The series was canceled after one season despite having an average household rating of 11.4, tying it for 24th place among all TV shows that year.

Episodes

References

External links 
 

1995 American television series debuts
1996 American television series endings
1990s American sitcoms
CBS original programming
Television series by CBS Studios
Television series by Sony Pictures Television
English-language television shows
Television shows set in New York City